Guido Manini Stratta (born 8 December 1958) is an Uruguayan politician and retired general officer who served as Commander-in-Chief of the National Army, serving in this post from 1 February 2015 until being sacked by the president on 12 March 2019.

In 2019, he joined the newly founded Open Cabildo party. He ran for president and Senator in the 2019 Uruguayan general election.

Family and education 
Manini is a grandson of Colorado politician Pedro Manini Ríos who was a senator, a diputate and Minister of the Interior. He is Catholic and has Italian origins.

He attended his primary and secondary studies at the Lycée Français de Montevideo. In 1973 he enrolled in the Liceo Militar General Artigas and two years later he entered the Military School. He also has a degree in history from the Catholic University.

Military career 
He served on official missions in Iran and Iraq between 1988 and 1989 as a member of the United Nations Military Observer Group (UNIIMOG). Between 1993 and 1994 he joined an observation group in Mozambique. The next year he was conferred the degree of major.

In 1996 he joined a delegation of the Military Institute of Higher Studies (IMES) where he received instruction in the United States, he returned in 2010, as a Military Attaché attached to the Uruguayan Embassy in that country and as an Advisor to the Inter-American College defense.

He received the rank of lieutenant colonel and colonel in 1999 and 2003 respectively and was promoted to general in 2011.

Commander-in-Chief of the Uruguayan Army 
In February 2015 he was promoted to the position of commander-in-chief of the army. In September 2018, he was punished for public statements in which he criticized the approval of a reform of the pension system of the military. This sanction was the toughest imposed on a general since the end of the dictatorship in 1985.

In March 2019, the decision of the court of honor created in the armed forces to analyze the human rights violations of retired military personnel Jorge "Pajarito" Silveira Quesada, José Nino Gavazzo and Luis Alfredo Maurente Mata committed during the dictatorship was made public. As a result, Manini criticized the Uruguayan court. This was the reason why President Tabaré Vázquez decided to dismiss him.

Political career 
In April 2019, he was announced as running for president by the Open Cabildo party. In the 2019 presidential primaries, Manini obtained 49,485 votes, being the fourth most voted political force. In the October general election he won a seat in the Senate. He obtained 268.736 votes, 11,04 %.

He assumed as Senator on February 15, 2020, at the beginning of the XLIX Legislature.

Awards
 Order of Aeronautical Merit (Brazil)

References

External links

1958 births
Living people
Uruguayan National Army generals
Catholic University of Uruguay alumni
Uruguayan politicians
Right-wing populism in South America
Open Cabildo (Uruguay) politicians
Candidates for President of Uruguay
Uruguayan people of Italian descent